The Triomphant was a ship of the line of the French Navy. She was a three-decker, although the upper deck was only partially armed, with an unarmed sections between the guns towards the bow and those towards the stern. She was built from 1665-1667 as the Princesse, and under this name she took part in the Expedition to Candia in 1669, but she was renamed Triomphant on 24 June 1671 and subsequently Constant on 28 June 1678. She was converted into a hulk in 1690 and renamed Vieux Constant, surviving in this role until 1704.

References

Nomenclature des Vaisseaux du Roi-Soleil de 1661 a 1715. Alain Demerliac (Editions Omega, Nice – various dates).
The Sun King's Vessels (2015) - Jean-Claude Lemineur; English translation by François Fougerat. Editions ANCRE.  
Winfield, Rif and Roberts, Stephen (2017) French Warships in the Age of Sail 1626-1786: Design, Construction, Careers and Fates. Seaforth Publishing. . 

Ships of the line of the French Navy
1660s ships
Ships built in France